The Little Brown Jug is a harness race for three-year-old pacing standardbred horses hosted by the Delaware County Agricultural Society since 1946 at the Delaware County Fairgrounds racetrack in Delaware, Ohio. The race takes place every year on the third Thursday after Labor Day.

Along with the Hambletonian, a race for trotters, it is one of the two most coveted races for standardbreds. The event is named after the Little Brown Jug, a pacer, who won nine consecutive races and became a USTA Hall of Fame Immortal in 1975.

The race is the counterpart to the Jugette for three-year-old fillies.

History
It began in 1937 when the Delaware County Agricultural Society's members, at their annual meeting, voted to move the County Fair, held since its inception at Powell, to Delaware on a tract of land at the northern edge of the city. Two years later a half-mile track was built and provided the stage for harness racing. R.K. McNamara, a local contractor, designed and built the lightning fast track. Enter attorney Joe Neville, whose family had been identified with the standardbred sport for many years, and his friend, Henry C. "Hank" Thomson, sports editor of The Delaware Gazette. Neville, who had campaigned horses on the Grand Circuit and was familiar with its officers and stewards, was successful in obtaining Grand Circuit dates for the new Delaware track. Neville, concerned over the years by the emphasis placed on the trotter, turned his efforts toward showcasing the pacers, particularly the 3-year-olds. The Little Brown Jug Society was formed to stage the Grand Circuit meeting. Neville headed the organization with Thomson as secretary-treasurer. Then came the birth of the Little Brown Jug, named through a newspaper contest won by Major Lanning Parsons, with its previews in 1944 and 1945. The initial Jug in 1946, with a purse of $35,358, was won by Ensign Hanover with Delaware's Wayne "Curly" Smart driving. Smart, a most successful trainer-driver on the Grand Circuit, was later to become an integral part of the Jug's operation as the track superintendent. Over the years the track monopolized the half-mile record section with world standard performances, mainly through Smart's skill in maintaining the fastest racing strip of its size in the country.

Through its humble beginnings, the Jug grew slowly to become perhaps the most traditional stake on the pacing gait. In 1956 the Jug provided the anchor for the newly designated Triple Crown of Pacing to go along with the Cane Pace (currently held at the Meadowlands Racetrack in East Rutherford, New Jersey) and the Messenger Stakes (currently held at Yonkers Raceway in Yonkers, New York).

Race Structure
The Little Brown Jug is contested in heats. The first heat is split into several divisions, with the top finishers in each division returning to contest the second heat. A horse wins the Little Brown Jug by winning both heats. If a horse does not win both heats, a race off is conducted between the first heat division winners, and the winner of the second heat, to determine the champion.

Ever since 1946 the administrators of the Little Brown Jug have glazed the winners of the horse race on a jug. In 2005, they ran out of room on the first jug and had to make another one. This time, instead of making it out of clay, they made it out of plastic so it would be lighter.

Records
 Most wins by a driver
 5 – Billy Haughton (1955, 1964, 1968, 1969, 1974) 
 5 – Michel Lachance (1988, 1989, 1994, 1997, 2001)
 5 – David Miller (2003, 2008, 2011, 2016, 2018)

 Most wins by a trainer
 6 – Billy Haughton (1955, 1964, 1968, 1969, 1974, 1985)

 Stakes record
 1:49 0/0 – Betting Line (2016)

Little Brown Jug winners

References

Recurring sporting events established in 1946
Harness races in the United States
Harness races for three-year-old pacers
United States Triple Crown of Harness Racing
Tourist attractions in Delaware County, Ohio
Horse racing in Ohio
1946 establishments in Ohio
Delaware, Ohio